Sacred Fire: Live in South America is an album by Santana, released in 1993. This album is dedicated to the life of Cesar Chavez. The title, "Live in South America", is not correct, as the location of the concert production, Mexico City, is not located on the continent of South America.

There is also a video of this album, by the similar name of Sacred Fire: Live in Mexico, featuring additional songs not featured on the album. Produced by Paul Flattery and directed by Peter Nydrle. As well as the concert, the video features shots of Carlos playing guitar at various historic sites around Mexico City.

The album peaked at 181 in the Billboard 200.

Track listing
"Angels All Around Us" (Sanders) – 1:57
"Vive la Vida (Life Is for Living)" (Sefolosha) – 4:18
"Esperando" (Santana, Thompson, Perazzo, Charles) – 5:58
"No One to Depend On" (Carabello, Escovedo, Rolie) – 4:38
"Black Magic Woman / Gypsy Queen" (Green/Szabo) – 8:53
"Oye Como Va" (Puente) – 5:07
"Samba Pa Ti" (Santana) – 6:49
"Guajira" (Brown, Areas, Reyes) – 6:13
"Make Somebody Happy" (Santana, Ligertwood) – 7:14
"Toussaint l'Overture" (Santana, Areas, Brown, Carabello, Rolie, Schon, Shrieve) – 6:52
"Soul Sacrifice / Don't Try This at Home" (Santana, Areas, Brown, Carabello, Rolie, Schon, Shrieve/Perazzo, Rekow) – 7:26
"Europa (Earth's Cry Heaven's Smile)" (Santana, Coster) – 6:11
"Jin-Go-Lo-Ba" (Olatunji) – 5:43

A bonus disc with 3 additional tracks ("Spirits Dancing in the Flesh", "Wings of Grace", "Get It in Your Soul") were included in a limited edition Japanese re-release.

Personnel

 Alex Ligertwood – vocals
 Vorriece Cooper – vocals, percussion
 Carlos Santana – guitars, vocals
 Jorge Santana – guitars, vocals
 Chester Thompson – organ, keyboards, vocals
 Myron Dove – bass guitar, vocals
 Walfredo Reyes Jr. – drums
 Karl Perazzo – percussion, conga, timbales, vocals
 Raul Rekow – percussion, conga, vocals

Charts

Certifications

CD

DVD

References

External links 

 Santana – Sacred Fire: Live in South America (1993) album releases & credits at Discogs.com
 Santana – Sacred Fire: Live in South America (1993) album credits & user reviews at ProgArchives.com
 Santana – Sacred Fire: Live in South America (1993) album review by William Ruhlmann, credits, releases and Billboard charts at AllMusic.com

Albums produced by Carlos Santana
1993 live albums
Santana (band) live albums
Polydor Records live albums